Coelioxys porterae is a species of bee in the family Megachilidae.

References

Further reading

External links

 

porterae
Articles created by Qbugbot
Insects described in 1900